Donau (A516) is the sixth ship of the s of the German Navy.

Development 

The Elbe-class replenishment ships are also known tenders of the German Navy. In German, this type of ship is called Versorgungsschiffe which can be translated as "supply ship" though the official translation in English is "replenishment ship". 

They are intended to support German naval units away from their home ports. The ships carry fuel, provisions, ammunition and other matériel and also provide medical services. The ships are named after German rivers where German parliaments were placed.

Construction and career 
Donau was launched in March 1994 in Bremen-Vegesack, Germany. She was commissioned on 15 November 1994.

On 11 January 2020, Donau under the command of Captain Bernd Abshagen left her home port of Warnemünde to join the Standing NATO Mine Countermeasures Group 1 (SNMCMG1).

Gallery

References

External links 

Elbe-class replenishment ships
1994 ships
Ships built in Bremen (state)